The Collierville Kroger shooting was a mass shooting that occurred on September 23, 2021, at a Kroger grocery store in Collierville, Tennessee. One person was killed and 13 others were injured before the gunman, identified as 29-year-old Uk Thang, committed suicide by gunshot. Thang was working at the store as a third-party vendor. It was the second shooting in 2021 to occur at a Kroger-owned property; the first occurred at a King Soopers store in Boulder, Colorado, in March.

Shooting
On the day of the shooting, the gunman, Uk Thang, got into an altercation with another Kroger employee and was asked to leave at 7:00 a.m. He returned to his apartment and later left at 12:30 p.m. After calling his brother at 1:30 p.m. to tell him he would never see him again, Thang returned to the store and opened fire with two pistols and a rifle that he brought with him. At the time of the shooting, 44 employees and a number of customers were inside the building.

A cashier told reporters that Thang came in while she was working and began to open fire almost immediately. He shot a coworker and a customer in front of the employee. Another employee described Thang finding her and her coworkers while they were hiding and shooting at them, hitting at least two. A third employee saw other employees and customers running towards her from the front of the store.

Authorities began receiving 9-1-1 calls at around 1:30 p.m. reporting an active shooter situation at the Kroger store. The first police officers arrived on the scene at 1:34 p.m., and they began clearing the store by searching aisle by aisle. Officers discovered people hiding in freezers and locked offices as many had run away from Thang. He was later found dead at the back of the store from a self-inflicted gunshot wound.

Victims
A 70-year-old female customer was killed, and 13 others – ten employees and three customers – were wounded in the shooting. One other individual checked into a hospital due to an anxiety attack. Regional One Health received nine patients, with four of them in critical condition. Methodist Le Bonheur received two patients; one underwent surgery, while the other was in stable condition. Saint Francis Hospital-Memphis received a twelfth patient. By September 26, all of the seriously and critically wounded patients were recovering.

Perpetrator
Police identified the shooter as 29-year-old Uk Thang (October 17, 1991—September 23, 2021), who had been living in Collierville since the summer of 2020 and was working as a third-party vendor at the Kroger store's sushi outlet. He had been asked to leave his job on the morning of the shooting. According to family friends and acquaintances, Thang was the son of refugees from Myanmar who settled in Utah and then Nashville. Neighbors described not knowing Thang, who they only saw coming and going from the apartment complex they lived in. According to police, he did not have a specific target during the shooting. He had a few misdemeanors on his criminal record, but no violent criminal history. A coworker described Thang as quiet and only interacting with his fellow sushi workers, but also sometimes arguing with other coworkers. Thang legally purchased the guns used in the shooting within the 18 months preceding the incident.

Investigation
Multiple law enforcement agencies, including the Shelby County Sheriff's Office, the Memphis Police Department, and members of the FBI and ATF, responded to the store. Thang's vehicle was searched in the parking lot, and a bomb robot was used to remove a box from inside. Police later seized electronics and other evidence at Thang's home in an apartment complex.

Aftermath

Collierville High School and other local schools were put on lockdown as a precautionary measure due to the shooting, but it was lifted later in the day. Students at the high school were asked to wear maroon on September 24 as a sign of solidarity to the school and the town. Collierville city officials were offered support from Boulder, Colorado, where a mass shooting at a King Soopers store had occurred in March.

Kroger offered counseling services for its employees almost immediately after the shooting and has closed the store until the investigation is concluded. The Collierville police chief praised the store employees and customers, saying "I've never seen anything like it... We found people hiding in freezers and in locked offices. They were doing what they were trained to do: run, hide, fight."

After over a month of remodeling, Kroger announced that the store would reopen on November 10 with improved security.

See also
List of mass shootings in the United States in 2021

References

2021 in Tennessee
2021 mass shootings in the United States
2021 murders in the United States
Attacks in the United States in 2021
Attacks on buildings and structures in 2021
Attacks on buildings and structures in the United States
Attacks on supermarkets
2021 shooting
Deaths by firearm in Tennessee
Mass shootings in Tennessee
Mass shootings in the United States
Murder–suicides in Tennessee
September 2021 crimes in the United States
Workplace shootings in the United States
2021 active shooter incidents in the United States

fr:Fusillade de Collierville